In mathematical analysis, a Carathéodory function (or  Carathéodory integrand) is a multivariable function that allows us to solve the following problem effectively: A composition of two Lebesgue-measurable functions does not have to be Lebesgue-measurable as well. Nevertheless, a composition of a measurable function with a continuous function is indeed Lebesgue-measurable, but in many situations, continuity is a too restrictive assumption. Carathéodory functions are more general than continuous functions, but still allow a composition with Lebesgue-measurable function to be measurable. Carathéodory functions play a significant role in calculus of variation, and it is named after the Greek mathematician Constantin Carathéodory.

Definition 

, for  endowed with the Lebesgue measure, is a Carathéodory function if:

1. The mapping  is Lesbegue-measurable for every .

2. the mapping  is continuous for almost every . 

Example 
The fact that  is a Carathéodory function ensures us that  is well-defined.

p-growth 

References 

Calculus of variations